Kapchorwa District is a district in the Eastern Region of Uganda. The town of Kapchorwa is the district's main municipal, administrative, and commercial center, and is the site of the district headquarters. It is also the home district of Stephen Kiprotich, the men's marathon gold medalist at the 2012 Olympic Games in London, and Joshua Cheptegei, the men's 5,000 m gold medalist at the 2021 Olympic Games in Tokyo.

Location
The district is bordered by Kween District to the northeast and east, Sironko District to the south, and Bulambuli District to the west and northeast. The coordinates of the district are 01 24N, 34 27E.

Overview
Under the colonial administration, Kapchorwa District was Sebei County, located in North Bugisu in the now defunct Bukedi District. Kapchorwa was granted district status on 1 February 1962, shortly before Uganda became an independent country.

Kapchorwa District is home mostly to Kalenjin peoples, including the sub-groups Sabiny, Pokot, and Nandi. They were mainly cattle keepers in the late 1960s, but that changed when their northern neighbors, the Karamojong, raided most of their cattle and displaced hundreds of people. The populations most affected lived along the Kapchorwa plains; particularly in Ngenge Sub-County of Kapchorwa District and in Bukwo District. This displacement of the population has resulted in abject poverty among the affected households. People have been forced to live in Internally Displaced People camps, with very limited resources.

In 2005, Kongasis County was split off of the district to form Bukwo District. In 2010, more territory was peeled off to form Kween District. Together, Kapchorwa District, Bukwo District, and Kween District comprise the Sebei sub-region, home to an estimated 200,000 according to the 2002 national census.

Population
In 1991, the national population census estimated the district population at 48,700. The 2002 national census estimated the population at 74,300, with an annual growth rate of 4.5 percent. In 2012, it was estimated that the population had grown to about 114,100. In August 2014, the national population census enumerated the population at 104,580.

Economic activities
Subsistence agriculture is the main economic activity in Kapchorwa District. Crops grown include the following:

Animal husbandry is practised; the livestock domesticated are mainly cattle, goats, and chickens.

See also
Sebei

References

External links
 Cattle Rustling In The Great Lakes Region by Saul Chemonges Kasumbein
 Kapchorwa: The Land of sports, beauty

 
Sebei sub-region
Districts of Uganda
Eastern Region, Uganda